The Nukapu expedition was a British punitive expedition from October 1871 until February 1872, in response to the murder of missionary John Coleridge Patteson by natives of Nukapu, one of the easternmost islands of the Solomon Islands in the South Pacific Ocean. A Royal Navy warship was sent to the island, sinking a group of hostile war-canoes and landing men to attack a fortified village.

Expedition 
In October 1871, the screw sloop-of-war  was operating against blackbirders in the South Sea Islands when her captain, Commander Albert Hastings Markham, received orders to sail for Nukapu in the Solomon Islands. The measures taken by Rosario became the subject of questions in the House of Commons, and Markham's book on the subject may well have been prompted by them. The book itself makes clear that Markham clearly understood the cycle of violence and deplored both the murderous activities of the blackbirders, and the apparent need for further violence in restoring order.

References

Footnotes

Bibliography 

 

Battles involving canoes
Battles involving the United Kingdom
Conflicts in 1871
Conflicts in 1872
History of the Solomon Islands
Punitive expeditions of the United Kingdom
Violence against indigenous peoples